Große Freiheit (German for 'Great Freedom') is the seventh album by the Neue Deutsche Härte band Unheilig. It was released on February 19, 2010, as a standard 14-track album and a Fanbox Edition boxset which was limited to 5,000 copies that contains the following:

a limited edition 16-track studio album (including 2 bonus tracks) in digipak.
a bonus CD of unreleased studio recordings of Unheilig from the current studio sessions and recordings and songs from the first musical steps of Der Graf so far (never published).
an Unheilig flag.
Autobiography of Der Graf, 176-sided: Der Graf tells of his first musical steps up to his latest album Große Freiheit.

The album's title refers to a street in Hamburg-St. Pauli, the Große Freiheit, a side-street of the Reeperbahn.

Track listing

Bonus disc

 Human Nations (First Musical Steps in 1992)
 The Beast (First Musical Steps in 1992)
 Lost Heaven (Unpublished song from the early Unheiligzeit)
 Faded Times (Unpublished song from the early Unheiligzeit)
 Seenot (Demo)
 Für Immer (Demo)
 Unter deiner Flagge (Demo)
 Geboren um zu leben (Demo)
 Geboren um zu leben (Demo 2)

Live album
On June 11, 2010, a live album was released with the same name, which contains a boxset with a CD and the DVD featuring the show. A Limited Delux Edition contains four discs while the Special Edition contains two discs.

Chart performance
In Germany, it remained at No. 1 for 23 non-consecutive weeks, to date the longest stay of any album in the 21st century and the first album by a German artist to do so.

Große Freiheit is the second most downloaded album of all time in Germany behind Adele's 21, with digital sales between 100,000 and 140,000.

Spending 52 weeks in the German top ten, the album is the 17th album to spend a year or longer there and the first to do so since Ich + Ich's Vom selben Stern, which was released in July 2007. Große Freiheit left the top 5 of the German Albums Chart for the first time the week it achieved this feat.

Chart positions

Year-end charts

Decade-end charts

Certifications and sales

Große Freiheit (Winter Edition)
This album was re-released on November 19, 2010, with all of the standard 14 tracks from Große Freiheit, excluding the two bonus songs. A second disc contains "Winterland" and its remixes. There is a new cover to reflect the title.

Track listing

Grosse Freiheit Tour 2010-2011

2010
March 5 - Berlin, Germany - The Dome 53 at Velodrom
March 19 - Bochum, Germany - RuhrCongress Halle
March 20 - Erfurt, Germany - Stadthalle
March 27 - Giessen, Germany - Hessenhalle
April 1 - Munchen, Germany - Zenith
April 3 - Berlin, Germany - Columbia Halle
April 4 - Dresdon, Germany - Alter Schlachthof
April 5 - Dresdon, Germany - Alter Schlachthof
April 9 - Magdeburg, Germany - Factory
April 10 - Hamburg, Germany - Docks Club
April 11 - Hamburg, Germany - Docks Club
April 12 - Hamburg, Germany - Docks Club
April 16 - Leipzig, Germany - Agra Halle
April 17 - Cologne, Germany - Palladium
April 30 - Pratteln, Switzerland - Z7
May 1 - Pratteln, Switzerland - Z7
May 2 - Bosen, Germany - Hexentanz Festival
May 6 - Bielefeld, Germany - Ringlokschuppen
May 7 - Bielefeld, Germany - Ringlokschuppen
May 8 - Wurzburg, Germany - Posthalle
May 9 - Berlin, Germany - Columbia Halle
May 12 - Vienna, Austrua - Gasometer
May 14 - Cologne, Germany - Palladium
May 15 - Oberhausen, Germany - Turbinenhalle
May 20 - Stuttgart, Germany - The Dome 54 at Hanns-Martin-Schleyer-Halle
May 21 - Stuttgart, Germany - Liederhalle
May 22 - Stuttgart, Germany - Liederhalle
May 29 - Hamburg, Germany - Grand Prix Party at Spielburdenplatz
June 11 - Interlaken, Switzerland - Greenfield Festival
June 12 - Gelsenkirchen, Germany - Blackfield festival
July 10 - Göttingen, Germany - MTV Campus Invasion 2010
July 16 - Waregum, Belgium - Gothic Festival
July 30 - Grafenheinichen, Germany - Jump Community Party at Ferropolis
July 31 - Hanau Am Main, Germany - Amphitheater
August 1 - Hanau Am Main, Germany - Amphitheater
August 7 - Hildesheim, Germany - Mera Luna Festival
August 15 - Schwetzingen, Germany - Grosse Freiheit Open Air
August 20 - Stormthal, Germany - Highfield Festival
August 21 - Schwerin, Germany - Freilichtbuhne
August 27 - Hamburg - Germany - HTA Hambuger Trab-Arena
August 28 - Potsdam, Germany - Metropolis Halle
September 2 - Wiesen, Austria - Two Days A Week Festival
September 17 - Hemer, Germany - Landesgartenschaugelande
September 18 - Bern, Switzerland - Bierhubeli
September 19 - Zurich, Switzerland -  One By One Festival
October 1 - Berlin, Germany - Bundesvision at Hanns-Martin-Schleyer-Halle
October 22 - Hohenems, Austria - Tennis Events Center
October 23 - Linz, Austria - Posthof
October 24 - Graz, Austria - Helmut-List-Halle
November 12 - Siegen, Germany - Siegerlandhalle
November 13 - Siegen, Germany - Siegerlandhalle
November 18 - Frankfurt, Germany - Jahrhunderthalle
November 19 - Frankfurt. Germany - Jahrhunderthalle
November 20 - Regensburg, Germany - Donau Arena
November 25 - Vienna, Austria - Gasometer
November 26 - Furth, Germany - Stadthalle (Furth)
November 27 - Munster, Germany - Halle Munsterland
December 2 - Bochum, Germany - 1 Live Krone 2010
December 4 - Bremen, Germany - Bremen-Arena
December 5 - Kiel, Germany - Sparkassen-Arena
December 10 - Braunschweig, Germany - Volkswagen Halle
December 11 - Chemnitz, Germany - Messe
December 14 - Mannheim, Germany - Maimarktclub
December 15 - Kassel, Germany - Kongress Palais-Blauersaal
December 17 - Ulm, Germany - Donauhalle
December 18 - Trier, Germany - Trier Arena
December 25 - Berlin, Germany - Berlin Arena
December 26 - Berlin, Germany - Berlin Arena
December 28 - Kempton, Germany - BigBox
December 29 - Freiburg, Germany - Rothaus Arena
December 30 - Düsseldorf, Germany - Phillips Halle

2011
January 2 - Lingen, Germany - Emslandhallen
January 7 - Magdeburg, Germany - Stadthalle
January 8 - Bamburg, Germany - Stechert Arena
January 9 - Salzburg, Austria - Salzburg Arena
January 14 - Dortmund, Germany - Westfalenhallen
January 15 - Karlsruhe, Germany - Europahalle
January 20 - Augsburg, Germany - Schwabenhalle
January 21 - Hannover, Germany - AWD Hall
January 22 - Erfurt, Germany - Thuringenhalle
January 28 - Rostock, Germany - Stadthalle
January 29 - Cottbus, Germany - Messehalle
February 4 - Cologne, Germany - Lanxess Arena
February 5 - Magdeburg, Germany - Stadthalle
March 24 - Berlin, Germany - Echo 2011
May 27 - Hannover, Germany - Expoplaza
June 4 - Gelsenkirchen, Germany - Amphitheater
June 5 - Gelsenkirchen, Germany - Amphitheater
June 17 - Bonn, Germany - Kunst-und Ausstellungshalle
June 18 - Fulda, Germany - Messe-Galerie
June 25 - Frankfurt, Germany - Stadion Im Sportpark
July 1 - Basel, Switzerland - St.Jacobshalle
July 2 - Clam, Austria - Burgclam
July 3 - Clam, Austria - Burgclam
July 7 - Dresden, Germany - Elbufer
July 8 - Dresden, Germany - Elbufer
July 9 - Dresden, Germany - Elbufer
July 10 - Heilbrenn, Germany - Wertwiessen Park
July 15 - Bielfeld, Germany - Ravensburger Park
July 16 - Ulm, Germany - KlosterWiblingen
July 17 - Baden-Baden, Germany - Rennplatz
July 22 - Emmendingen, Germany - Schlossplatz
July 23 - Munchen, Germany - OlympiaPark
July 24 - Schwabisch Gmind, Germany - Schiesstal Platz
July 30 - Erfurt, Germany - Streigerwald Stadion
August 6 - Berlin, Germany - Kindl-Buhne Wuhlheide
August 7 - Berlin, Germany - Kindl-Buhne Wuhlheide
August 20 - Braunschweig, Germany - Volksbank Brawobuhne
August 21 - Coburg, Germany - Schlossplatz
August 26 - Losheim, Germany - Stranbad
August 27 - Bremen, Germany - Pier 2
August 28 - Hamburg, Germany - Trabenbahn
September 1 - Rostock, Germany - IGA Park
September 2 - Monchengladbach, Germany - Warsteiner Hockey Park
September 3 - Gronau, Germany - Burgerhalle

See also
List of best-selling albums in Germany

References

Unheilig albums
2010 albums
Vertigo Records albums
German-language albums